"Say Goodbye" is a song by the American rock band Cheap Trick, which was released in 1997 as the lead single from their thirteenth studio album Cheap Trick. The song was written by guitarist Rick Nielsen, lead vocalist Robin Zander and bassist Tom Petersson, and was produced by Cheap Trick and Ian Taylor.

"Say Goodbye" reached number 19 on the Billboard Bubbling Under the Hot 100 chart and number 39 on the Billboard Mainstream Rock chart.

Release
"Say Goodbye" was released as the lead single from Cheap Trick. In the US, Red Ant began promoting the song to a number of different radio formats, including commercial alternative and triple-A, from March 24, 1997.

Music video
The song's music video was directed by Doug Freel. It features the band performing in front of an audience at the Rockford Theater in Rockford, Illinois, with interspersed footage shot on location in Chicago.

Critical reception
On its release, Larry Flick of Billboard described "Say Goodbye" as "gloriously melodious" and "one of Cheap Trick's best ever bits of Beatlemania", adding "that's saying something, considering the[ir] past achievements in that area". He added that the song had "warmth and personality" and felt its "distillation of power pop verities makes it an obvious add for both modern and mainstream rock outlets". Flick also praised "Yeah, Yeah" as a "hard rockin' highlight" from Cheap Trick that "wouldn't have sounded out of place" on Heaven Tonight''. In a review of the single, Doug Stone of AllMusic described the song and its B-side as "two first-class tunes" from the band's "artistically-pleasing but ultimately ill-fated revival". Stone commented that "Say Goodbye" "delivers an irksome send-off which quotes Dylan and the Beatles" whereas "Yeah Yeah" is a "strong and snarly album cut".

Track listing
CD and cassette single (US)
"Say Goodbye" (Cheap Rock Mix) - 3:30
"Yeah Yeah" (LP Edit) - 3:12

CD single (US promo)
"Say Goodbye" (Cheap Rock Mix) - 3:30

CD single (Australia)
"Say Goodbye" (Album Version) - 3:34
"Yeah Yeah" (LP Edit) - 3:12

3-inch CD single (Japan)
"Say Goodbye" (Cheap Rock Mix) - 3:30
"Yeah Yeah" (Album Version) - 3:14

Personnel
Cheap Trick
 Robin Zander - lead vocals, rhythm guitar
 Rick Nielsen - lead guitar, backing vocals
 Tom Petersson - bass, backing vocals
 Bun E. Carlos - drums, percussion

Production
 Cheap Trick – producers
 Ian Taylor – producer, engineer, mixer
 Bob Ludwig - mastering

Charts

Weekly charts

Year-end charts

References

1997 singles
1997 songs
Cheap Trick songs
Songs written by Rick Nielsen
Songs written by Robin Zander
Songs written by Tom Petersson